Shivlal Sharma was an Indian politician belonging to Indian National Congress. He was elected as a member of Himachal Pradesh Legislative Assembly from Chachiot in 1985. He died of cardiac arrest on 21 April 2019 at the age of 80.

References

1930s births
2019 deaths
Indian National Congress politicians
Himachal Pradesh MLAs 1985–1990